Ortwin (also Ortuin, latinized Ortuinus) is a German given name, from ort "point" and win "friend".

It has been conflated with the name Hartwin (also Hardwin, Arduinus, Arduino), from hart "hard, brave" and win "friend", especially in the case of  Hardwin von Grätz (1475–1542), better known in English as Ortwin, a German humanist scholar and theologian.

Given name
Ortwin has been used as a modern given name since the early 20th century:

Ortwin Czarnowski (born 1940), German cyclist
Ortwin De Wolf (born 1996), Belgian footballer
Ortwin Freyermuth (born 1958), German American video game executive, entertainment lawyer and film producer
Ortwin Gamber (born 1925), Austrian art historian
Ortwin Hess (born 1966), German theoretical physicist 
Ortwin Linger (1967–1989), Dutch-Surinamese footballer
Ortwin Passon (born 1962), German gay, HIV/AIDS and human rights activist
Ortwin Rodewald, East German rower  
Ortwin Runde (born 1944), German politician and mayor

Surname
Ostap Ortwin (real name Oskar Katzenellenbogen) (1876-1942), Polish Jewish journalist and literary critic

See also
Arduino (name)